Interstate 70 (I-70) in the US state of Missouri is generally parallel to the Missouri River. This section of the transcontinental Interstate begins at the Kansas state line on the Intercity Viaduct, running concurrently with US Route 24 (US 24), US 40, and US 169, and the east end is on the Stan Musial Veterans Memorial Bridge in St. Louis.

Route description
Crossing into Missouri on the Intercity Viaduct, I-70 immediately encounters the Downtown Loop, also called the Alphabet Loop, a small but complex loop of freeways with all of its exits having the number 2 and a letter suffix that uses the entire alphabet (except I, O, and Z). I-70 runs concurrently with I-35 once it enters into the Loop. Both Interstates maintain the concurrency until they approach the northeastern corner of the loop. Back at the northwest corner, US 169 splits off to the north, leaving four routes concurrent with each other. There is a large interchange with Route 9 in the loop's northeastern corner. At that corner, I-29 ends, and US 71 joins.

Once it leaves I-35, I-70 turns south, with interchanges to more roads. At the southeastern corner, I-70, US 40, US 24, and US 71 all exit the loop. I-70, US 40, and US 24 split off to the east, and US 71 continues south. I-670 ends at the alignment. Not long after they usurp that alignment, I-70/US 40/US 24 turn southeast. US 40 departs from I-70 at exit 7A. I-70 and US 24 then interchanges with I-435, the beltway around the Kansas City metropolitan area. US 24 departs from I-70 exit 8B and heads north following I-435.

While passing through Kansas City, I-70 is known as the George Brett Super Highway, named after former Kansas City Royals third baseman and Baseball Hall of Fame member George Brett. The Truman Sports Complex, which houses the Royals's and Chiefs's stadiums, is located adjacent to the I-70/I-435 interchange.

East of I-435, I-70 continues east through Independence, passing a busy cloverleaf interchange at I-470. The highway then continues with six lanes to the rapidly growing suburb of Blue Springs, where the roadway narrows to four lanes (two each direction) at Route 7.

East of Blue Springs, I-70 takes on a rural highway as it leaves Jackson County. The highway remains this way for the next , going through gently rolling terrain while it meets US 65 at a cloverleaf interchange and finally crossing the Missouri River at Rocheport just west of where it reaches the midsized college town of Columbia in the center of the state. Through Columbia, the highway is lined with restaurants and hotels and can get congested during University of Missouri sporting events. The highway leaves Columbia after an exit with St. Charles Road on the east end of town. East of Columbia, I-70 has an interchange with US 54 at Kingdom City, Route 19 at New Florence, and Route 47 at Warrenton. Then, it continues through more gently rolling terrain until it reaches Wentzville, where it meets I-64/US 61. Here, US 40 departs from I-70. It then expands to three lanes each direction to St. Louis.

East of Wentzville, I-70 passes through the bedroom community of Lake St. Louis, then the growing towns of O'Fallon and St. Peters, and finally the historic city of St. Charles. It crosses over the Missouri River one last time on the Blanchette Memorial Bridge, which is actually made up of two bridges: the westbound span built in the late 1950s and refurbished in 2013 and the eastbound one completed in the late 1970s.

Traffic volume increases as I-70 enters St. Louis County, requiring more lanes. There are as many as 13 lanes at one point. The section of I-70 from Fifth Street in St. Charles to I-270 is among the busiest section of highway in the state, with annual average daily traffic (AADT) counts approaching 165,000 in 2005.

I-270 draws much of the traffic, so I-70 continues east through Bridgeton with only six lanes. After interchanges with Route 180 (St. Charles Rock Road) and US 67 (Lindbergh Boulevard), it passes on the southern edge of St. Louis Lambert International Airport and through several bedroom communities—including Edmundson, Berkeley, Ferguson, and Jennings—and crossing I-170 in the process.

As it finally enters the city of St. Louis, motorists encounter what are signed as the "Express Lanes", known by the Missouri Department of Transportation (MoDOT) as the "reversible lanes". Two lanes in the middle of the freeway are separated from the eastbound and westbound lanes by Jersey barriers. Due to traffic pattern changes caused by the I-64 reconstruction, the lanes travel eastbound all day. MoDOT regularly monitors traffic patterns of this stretch of I-70 and will adjust the express lane traffic patterns accordingly. These lanes have no entrance or exit ramps, except at the ends.

Just before it enters downtown, I-70 turns to the east to cross the Stan Musial Veterans Memorial Bridge, which redirects the highway's traffic away from the congested Poplar Street Bridge  to the south. This  stretch of former I-70 is now an extension of I-44.

History

I-70 had been criticized for cutting off downtown from the Mississippi River waterfront particularly at the Gateway Arch. St. Louis constructed a $90-million (equivalent to $ in ) project to cover the highway (now I-44) by the arch.

This was not the first controversy involving I-70 and the arch. In 1959, builders of the Poplar Street Bridge asked for the National Park Service to give  of the park for the bridge. The request generated enormous controversy and ultimately  was turned over to use for the bridge.

The New Mississippi River Bridge was finished and opened to traffic on Sunday, February 9, 2014. It reroutes and redirects I-70 traffic off the congested Poplar Street Bridge. The bridge was named in honor of St. Louis Cardinals baseball legend Stan Musial.

, US 24 follows I-70 east to I-435 north. US 24 that used to follow Independence Avenue will become a business route of US 24.

Future
I-70 across central Missouri is one of the oldest stretches of Interstate Highway in the system, as some sections date back as far as the late 1950s. As a result, the exits often have short, substandard acceleration and deceleration ramps and the median is relatively narrow. Certain spots of both directions of traffic are separated by no more than a Jersey barrier. Also, a number of overpasses have low clearance, especially railway overpasses. Long-term plans have been identified to expand the highway to between six and eight lanes across the middle of the state. Tolling the Interstate has become a possible alternative, although the public does not support this idea.

A March 2010 study of I-70 from the Kansas state line to the I-470 interchange identified several possible improvements, including expanding the freeway from four to eight lanes, adding high-occupancy vehicle or toll lanes, reconstructing the Truman Road interchange, and improving the curves at Jackson Avenue and Truman Road. Some novel ideas included a new alignment of I-70 as a tunnel from the southeast corner of the downtown loop to 22nd/23rd streets, covering the southern portion of the downtown loop (I-670), or making the downtown loop into a unidirectional freeway around downtown, essentially becoming a large roundabout. In 2023, Governor Mike Parson announced a proposal to widen I-70 to six lanes (three lanes each way) across the state.

The Missouri Hyperloop is a proposed high-speed transportation route that would complement and relieve I-70.

MoDOT plans to replace the Rocheport Bridge, which crosses the Missouri River near Rocheport, with two bridges. Currently, one bridge carries four lanes of I-70. Construction of one span began in 2021.

Exit list

Related routes

Alternate route

Business routes

Auxiliary routes

References

External links

 Missouri
70
Transportation in Jackson County, Missouri
Transportation in Lafayette County, Missouri
Transportation in Saline County, Missouri
Transportation in Cooper County, Missouri
Transportation in Boone County, Missouri
Transportation in Callaway County, Missouri
Transportation in Montgomery County, Missouri
Transportation in Warren County, Missouri
Transportation in St. Charles County, Missouri
Transportation in St. Louis County, Missouri
Roads in St. Louis